MAN Energy Solutions SE is a German multinational company based in Augsburg that produces large-bore gas and diesel engines and also turbomachinery for marine, rail and stationary applications, as locomotive and marine propulsion systems, power plant applications, and turbochargers. The company was formed in 2010 from the merger of MAN Diesel and MAN Turbo. MAN Energy Solutions is a subsidiary of the German carmaker Volkswagen Group.

The Danish part of the company was formed out of the Burmeister & Wain ship building company, and the marketing name for the largest two-stroke engines still has "B&W" in it.

MAN Energy Solutions designs two-stroke and four-stroke engines that are manufactured both by the company and by its licensees. The engines have power outputs ranging from 450 kW to 87 MW. MAN Diesel & Turbo also designs and manufactures gas turbines of up to 50 MW, steam turbines of up to 150 MW and compressors with volume flows of up to 1.5 million m3/h and pressures of up to 1,000 bar. The product range is rounded off by turbochargers, CP propellers, gas engines and chemical reactors. The product range of MAN Energy Solutions includes complete marine propulsion systems, turbomachinery units for the oil & gas as well as the process industries and turnkey power plants. Customers receive worldwide after-sales services marketed under the "MAN PrimeServ" brand. The company employs around 14,413 staff (2013) at more than 100 international sites, primarily in Germany, Denmark, France, Switzerland, the Czech Republic, Italy, India, China and U.A.E. MAN Energy Solutions is a company of the Power Engineering business area of the Volkswagen Group.

Products

Marine Engines 

Two-stroke engines are developed at the company's base in Copenhagen, Denmark, and have a range of outputs from 2 MW to 90 MW. In view of their size, the engines are manufactured by international licensees in the immediate vicinity of dockyards. The engines propel large container vessels, freighters and oil tankers. Low-speed diesel engines do not require a transmission system because they are directly connected to the propellers by drive shafts.

MAN Diesel & Turbo also offers medium-speed four-stroke engines that cover a performance range from 450 kW to 21,600 kW and can be operated using liquid or gaseous fuel. Medium-speed engines are deployed to propel all types of merchant vessels, but are also used in passenger ships thanks to their compact nature and their amenability to flexible mounting.
  
As well as cruise liners, other areas of use for medium-speed engines include specialist vessels such as tugs, dredgers or cable-laying ships. Smaller medium-speed four-stroke engines are also used in high-speed ferries and naval vessels.

Turbocharger 
MAN Diesel & Turbo builds exhaust-gas turbochargers using single-stage radial and axial turbines to create high charging pressures. The performance spectrum of these chargers, which are used both in two-stroke and four-stroke marine engines and in stationary systems, ranges from around 300 kW to 30,000 kW of engine power.

Power Plants 

In the stationary sector, MAN diesel engines are primarily used for power plants and emergency power supplies. MAN Diesel & Turbo products range from small emergency power generators to turnkey power plants with outputs of up to 400 MW. The range of stationary systems comprises four-stroke engines with a unit output of 450 kW to 21,600 kW. MAN diesel engines are operated using heavy fuel oil, diesel, gas or renewable fuels such as Jatropha oil, animal fat or recycled vegetable oils. 
Under the brand MAN Power Management, the firm supplies integrated solutions for the management, operation and maintenance of diesel-fueled power plants.

Turbomachinery 

For industrial processes, including the production of fertilizers, iron and steel, as well as for petrochemical-manufacturing applications, MAN Diesel & Turbo develops and produces a variety of compressors, as well as steam and gas turbines for power generation.  Furthermore, the company offers gas-compression systems for the oil and gas industry (Upstream, Midstream and Downstream). This includes hermetically sealed compressors using magnetic bearings as well as high-pressure barrel compressors, with exit pressures ranging from 300 to 1,000 bar. 
  
MAN Diesel & Turbo also produces isothermal compressors for use in the production of industrial gases. These are supplied for standard industrial applications such as in the manufacture of specialty chemicals and metal products.  Other applications include the handling of bulk carbon dioxide and the production of bulk quantities of oxygen and nitrogen.
      
Production Locations are based in Oberhausen, Berlin, Hamburg, Zürich (Switzerland), South Africa and Schio (Italy).
  
 Gas Turbines
 MGT-6000 up to 7 MW, 1S single shaft  6.63 MW, 2S twin shaft 6.9 MW
 THM 9 - 13 MW, THM1304
 THM 3401, MGT6100, MGT6200

 Steam Turbines

Chemical reactors and apparatus 
In Deggendorf (Germany) MAN Energy Solutions produces Tubular Reactor Systems for the Chemical and Petrochemical Industries and research organisations under the brand DWE Reactors.

References

Companies based in Augsburg
Electrical generation engine manufacturers
Marine engine manufacturers
Gas turbine manufacturers
Engine manufacturers of Germany
MAN SE
Diesel engine manufacturers
Steam turbine manufacturers
Locomotive engine manufacturers
Turbocharger manufacturers
Industrial machine manufacturers
Gas engine manufacturers
Volkswagen Group